The Elkview Coal Mine is a coal mine located in the British Columbia. The mine has coal reserves amounting to 220.6 million tonnes of coking coal, one of the largest coal reserves in Canada and the world. The mine has an annual production capacity of 4.19 million tonnes of coal.

References 

Coal mines in Canada
Mines in British Columbia
Teck Resources